Endsleigh may refer to:

Endsleigh Cottage, former country house of the Dukes of Bedford
Endsleigh Insurance
Endsleigh League